Harry Shuman (March 5, 1915 – October 25, 1996) was a Major League Baseball pitcher who played for the Pittsburgh Pirates (1942–43) and the Philadelphia Phillies (1944).

He was born in Philadelphia, Pennsylvania, and was Jewish.  He attended Central High School and Temple University in Philadelphia.

Baseball career

Shuman is one of many ballplayers who only appeared in the major leagues during World War II. He made his major league debut on September 14, 1942, in a road game against the New York Giants at the Polo Grounds. He pitched two scoreless innings of relief in the 6–1 loss.

Shuman's career totals include 30 games pitched, all in relief, a 0–0 record with 19 games finished, 25 earned runs allowed in 50 innings, and an ERA of 4.44.

Late life
Shuman worked for the Philadelphia Democratic Committee, greeting visitors to the committee's offices, toward the end of his life.

Shuman died in his hometown of Philadelphia at the age of 81, and was buried in Haym Salomon Memorial Park in Frazer, Pennsylvania.

References

External links

1915 births
1996 deaths
Baseball players from Philadelphia
Jewish American baseball players
Jewish Major League Baseball players
Major League Baseball pitchers
Philadelphia Phillies players
Pittsburgh Pirates players
Temple Owls baseball players
Central High School (Philadelphia) alumni
20th-century American Jews